Harry Kesten (November 19, 1931 – March 29, 2019) was a German-born Dutch-Jewish American mathematician best known for his work in probability, most notably on random walks on groups and graphs, random matrices, branching processes, and percolation theory.

Biography 

Harry Kesten was born in Duisburg, Germany in 1931, and grew up in the Netherlands, where he moved with his parents in 1933 to escape the Nazis. Surviving the Holocaust, Kesten would study chemistry at the University of Amsterdam. He later moved to the United States and received his PhD in Mathematics in 1958 at Cornell University under the supervision of Mark Kac.  He was an instructor at Princeton University and the Hebrew University before returning to Cornell in 1961.

Kesten died on March 29, 2019, in Ithaca at the age of 87.

Mathematical work 
Kesten's work includes many fundamental contributions across almost the whole of probability, including the following highlights.

Random walks on groups.  In his 1958 PhD thesis, Kesten studied symmetric random walks on countable groups G  generated by a jump distribution with support G. He showed that the spectral radius equals the exponential decay rate of the return probabilities.  He showed later that this is strictly less than 1 if and only if the group is non-amenable. The last result is known as Kesten's criterion for amenability. He calculated the spectral radius of the d-regular tree, namely  .
Products of random matrices. Let  be the product of the first n elements of an ergodic stationary sequence of random  matrices.
Self-avoiding walks. Kesten's ratio limit theorem states that the number  of n-step self-avoiding walks from the origin on the integer lattice satisfies  where  is the connective constant. This result remains unimproved despite much effort.
Branching processes. Kesten and Stigum showed that the correct condition for the convergence of the population size, normalized by its mean, is that  where L is a typical family size.  With Ney and Spitzer, Kesten found the minimal conditions for the asymptotic distributional properties of a critical branching process, as discovered earlier, but subject to stronger assumptions, by Kolmogorov and Yaglom.

Random walk in a random environment. With Kozlov and Spitzer, Kesten proved a deep theorem about random walk in a one-dimensional random environment.  They established the limit laws for the walk across the variety of situations that can arise within the environment.
 Diophantine approximation. In 1966, Kesten resolved a conjecture of Erdős and Szűsz on the discrepancy of irrational rotations.
Diffusion-limited aggregation.
Percolation. Kesten's most famous work in this area is his proof that the critical probability of bond percolation on the square lattice equals 1/2. He followed this with a systematic study of percolation in two dimensions, reported in his book Percolation Theory for Mathematicians. His work on scaling theory and scaling relations has since proved key to the relationship between critical percolation and Schramm-Loewner evolution.
First passage percolation. Kesten's results for this growth model are largely summarized in Aspects of First Passage Percolation. He studied the rate of convergence to the time constant, and contributed to the topics of subadditive stochastic processes and concentration of measure. He developed the problem of maximum flow through a medium subject to random capacities.

A volume of papers was published in Kesten's honor in 1999. The Kesten memorial volume of Probability Theory and Related Fields contains a full list of the dedicatee's publications.

Selected works
with Mark Kac:  correction 65 1958 p. 67

with Zbigniew Ciesielski: 
with Don Ornstein and Frank Spitzer: 

with Geoffrey Grimmett:

See also 
 Amenable group
 Percolation theory

References

External links 
 

1931 births
2019 deaths
20th-century American mathematicians
21st-century American mathematicians
Dutch emigrants to the United States
Princeton University faculty
Academic staff of the Hebrew University of Jerusalem
Probability theorists
Cornell University alumni
Cornell University faculty
Brouwer Medalists
Fellows of Churchill College, Cambridge
Members of the Royal Netherlands Academy of Arts and Sciences
Members of the United States National Academy of Sciences
Fellows of the American Mathematical Society